Dendrolaelaspis is a genus of mites in the family Digamasellidae. There are about 19 described species in Dendrolaelaspis.

Species
These 19 species belong to the genus Dendrolaelaspis:

 Dendrolaelaspis angulosus (Willmann, 1936)
 Dendrolaelaspis baculus Karg, 2003
 Dendrolaelaspis baloghi (Hirschmann, 1974)
 Dendrolaelaspis bistilus (Karg, 1979)
 Dendrolaelaspis bregetovae (Shcherbak, 1978)
 Dendrolaelaspis brevisetosus (Shcherbak, 1978)
 Dendrolaelaspis cienfuegi (Wisniewski & Hirschmann, 1989)
 Dendrolaelaspis crassilaciniae (Wisniewski & Hirschmann, 1983)
 Dendrolaelaspis eucrinis (Karg, 1979)
 Dendrolaelaspis geminus Karg, 1998
 Dendrolaelaspis hungaricus (Hirschmann & Wisniewski, 1982)
 Dendrolaelaspis lindquisti (Shcherbak, 1978)
 Dendrolaelaspis lobatus (Shcherbak & Chelebiev, 1977)
 Dendrolaelaspis longisetosus (Shcherbak, 1977)
 Dendrolaelaspis miniangulosus (Shcherbak, 1978)
 Dendrolaelaspis orientalis (Bhattacharyya, 1969)
 Dendrolaelaspis piscis (Karg, 1979)
 Dendrolaelaspis poltavae Shcherbak & Sklar, 1983
 Dendrolaelaspis sexsetosus Karg & Schorlemmer, 2009

References

Acari